Marcelo Augusto Bonfá (born January 30, 1965), also known simply as Bonfá, is a Brazilian musician. Famous for being the drummer of Brazilian rock band Legião Urbana, after its disbanding he pursued a solo career, and has released three albums.

Biography
Bonfá was born in the city of Itapira, in the State of São Paulo, on January 30, 1965. His father was an employee of the Banco do Brasil, and in 1977, Bonfá's family moved to Brasília.

Bonfá played for the bands Blitz 64 and Dado e o Reino Animal (where he would meet future Legião Urbana member Dado Villa-Lobos) before forming Legião Urbana alongside Renato Russo in 1982. He stayed with Legião until its disestablishment in 1996.

In 2000, Bonfá released his first solo album, named O Barco Além do Sol (The Boat Beyond the Sun). It would be followed by 2004's Bonfá + Videotracks and 2007's Mobile.

In 1988, Bonfá had a son with actress Isabela Garcia, named João Pedro Bonfá, also a musician.

In 2012 he formed the band Bonfá e Os Corações Perfeitos, releasing two songs via his official website.

Discography

With Legião Urbana
 Legião Urbana (1985)
 Dois (1986)
 Que País É Este (1987)
 As Quatro Estações (1989)
 V (1991)
 Música P/ Acampamentos (1992)
 O Descobrimento do Brasil (1993)
 A Tempestade, ou O Livro dos Dias (1996)
 Uma Outra Estação (1997)
 Mais do Mesmo (1998)
 Acústico MTV (1999)
 Como é Que Se Diz Eu te Amo (2001)
 As Quatro Estações ao Vivo (2004)

Solo albums
 O Barco Além do Sol (2000)
 Bonfá + Videotracks (2004)
 Mobile (2007)

See also
 Legião Urbana
 Dado e o Reino Animal
 Brazilian rock

References

External links
 

1965 births
Living people
Brazilian rock musicians
20th-century Brazilian male singers
20th-century Brazilian singers
Brazilian drummers
People from Itapira